The Clarke–Mossman House is a house located in northwest Portland, Oregon, listed on the National Register of Historic Places.

See also
National Register of Historic Places listings in Northwest Portland, Oregon

References

Houses on the National Register of Historic Places in Portland, Oregon
Houses completed in 1893
Colonial Revival architecture in Oregon
1893 establishments in Oregon
Northwest Portland, Oregon